UEFA Euro 96 England is an association football video game developed by Gremlin Interactive and published by Sega for MS-DOS and the Sega Saturn in 1996. The title is an officially licensed tie in with the football tournament of the same name.

Gameplay 
Players can play the full European Championships or play friendly matches. The game features all sixteen national sides that qualified for Euro 1996 and all eight host stadia. It features commentary from Barry Davies, with the developers stating that Davies' script includes 30,000 words (up from 22,000 words for his Actua Soccer script).

The PC release offered online play for up to 20 players using BT's Wireplay network gaming system.

Development 
The game was developed with the engine used for Gremlin's previous football title Actua Soccer. Gremlin used the motion capture of professional footballers Andy Sinton, Chris Woods and Graham Hyde (of Sheffield Wednesday) for the development of Actua Soccer, but told CVG that for this release they had implemented "nearly twice as many frames of motion capture creating smoother movement", with particular assistance from Chris Woods to improve the goalkeeper AI.

Reception 

The title received largely positive reviews. Rob Bright of Sega Saturn Magazine gave the game a score of 94%, arguing that it featured "the tidiest graphics and most dynamic animation of any footy game on the Saturn". Sega Power's Nick Merritt wrote that "the attention to detail makes this a worthy tie-in for top quality European football" and that it "blows FIFA away, no contest", awarding the game a score of 90%.

References 

1996 video games
Association football video games
Sega Saturn games
Gremlin Interactive games
DOS games
UEFA Euro 1996
Video games set in 1996
Video games set in England
Video games developed in the United Kingdom
UEFA European Championship video games